Theskelomensor creon is a species of air-breathing land snail, a terrestrial pulmonate gastropod mollusk in the family Endodontidae. This species is endemic to Australia.

References

Gastropods of Australia
Endodontidae
Vulnerable fauna of Australia
Gastropods described in 1958
Taxonomy articles created by Polbot